Alan Simpson (born 22 May 1940) is a British former middle distance runner.

Athletics career
Simpson finished fourth in the 1500 metres at the 1964 Summer Olympics.

He represented England twice in the mile at the British Empire and Commonwealth Games.  He did not make the final at the Games in Perth, Australia. and was the silver medalist at the Games in Kingston, Jamaica.

References

1940 births
Living people
British male middle-distance runners
Olympic athletes of Great Britain
Athletes (track and field) at the 1964 Summer Olympics
Commonwealth Games medallists in athletics
Commonwealth Games silver medallists for England
Athletes (track and field) at the 1966 British Empire and Commonwealth Games
Medallists at the 1966 British Empire and Commonwealth Games